Limnonectes grunniens (common name: Amboina wart frog) is a species of frog in the family Dicroglossidae. It is found in Sulawesi, Molucca Islands, and New Guinea (Indonesia and Papua New Guinea). Frogs from Sulawesi may represent a different, undescribed species.

Limnonectes grunniens is a semi-aquatic frog living and breeding near and in streams, swamps, and pools in tropical rainforest. It can also be found in rural gardens and degraded forests. It is collected for human consumption, which may locally threaten it.

References

grunniens
Amphibians of Indonesia
Amphibians of Papua New Guinea
Amphibians of New Guinea
Amphibians of Sulawesi
Taxonomy articles created by Polbot
Amphibians described in 1801